Spain Again is a 1969 Spanish drama film directed by Jaime Camino. It was entered into the 1969 Cannes Film Festival. The film was also selected as the Spanish entry for the Best Foreign Language Film at the 41st Academy Awards, but was not accepted as a nominee.

Cast
 Manuela Vargas - María
 Mark Stevens - Dr. David Foster
 Marianne Koch - Kathy Foster
 Enrique Giménez 'El Cojo' - Maestro Miguel (as Enrique 'el cojo')
 Luis Serret - Manuel Oliver
 Luis Ciges - Padre Jacinto (as Luis Cijes)
 Joaquín Pujol - Hijo de Manuel
 Alberto Berco - Dr. Gavotty
 Alberto Puig - Dr. Tomás (as Alberto Puig Palau)
 Flor de Bethania Abreu - Teresa (as Flor de Bethania A.T.C.)
 Manuel Muñiz - Hombre Extraño (as Pajarito)

See also
 List of submissions to the 41st Academy Awards for Best Foreign Language Film
 List of Spanish submissions for the Academy Award for Best Foreign Language Film

References

External links

1969 films
Spanish drama films
1960s Spanish-language films
1969 drama films
Films directed by Jaime Camino
Spanish Civil War films
1960s Spanish films